The King is a character in Snow White.

Fairy tale
The unnamed King is the biological father of Snow White and the husband of the First Queen (the Queen that appeared in the beginning of the story). After the First Queen died whilst giving birth to Snow White, the King remarried a beautiful yet jealous woman who later became known as the Evil Queen. His fate is left unknown as he is never mentioned (or seen) again after his marriage to the Evil Queen throughout the entire story. He does not appear in the 1812 edition by the Brothers Grimm, where the Evil Queen is Snow White's biological mother.

Modern adaptations

Disney
While the King didn't appear in Snow White and the Seven Dwarfs, he did appear in the live-action musical adaption of the film. At the start of the show, the Evil Queen notices how much he loves Snow White. Rather than sharing a first dance with him, the Evil Queen lies to the King saying that she must arrange for the safety of the rest of her subjects back to her homeland in order instead. The King is later seen in the second act where he is very worried about Snow White, but the Prince and Huntsman tell him of the Evil Queen's jealousy and her plans for Snow White. The King orders the Queen's lady-in-waiting Luna to be brought before him and he decides to throw her in the dungeon to rot there for the rest of her days. At the end of the musical, he reunites with Snow White when she marries the Prince.

In 2021, in the Disney Before the Story book titled "Snow White's Birthday Wish", the king tells Snow White that she can have any horse she wants for her birthday, but the only one she wants is the hurt stallion she found in the woods.

Snow White (1987 film)
The King appears in the 1987 Snow White film portrayed by Doug Sheldon. After Snow White gets away from the Huntsman, the King feels heartbroken and is later killed in battle.

Grimm's Fairy Tale Classics
In the Grimm's Fairy Tale Classics adaption of Snow White, the King is mentioned by the narrator during Snow White's birth. When the King was married to the Evil Queen, the narrator mentioned that he was busy ruling his kingdom while the Evil Queen plotted to dispose of Snow White.

Happily Ever After: Fairy Tales for Every Child
In the Happily Ever After: Fairy Tales for Every Child rendition of Snow White set to a Native American-theme, Chief Brown Bear (voiced by Graham Greene) appears in the role of the King. When his wife dies when White Snow is a child, he takes in the daughter of another tribe's chief named Sly Fox as his stepwife. When White Snow goes missing, Chief Brown Bear organizes a search for her. Around the end of the episode, Chief Brown Bear learns of Sly Fox's treachery towards White Snow when he reunites with his daughter and the Seven Little Men where he condemns Sly Fox with her own words. When Sly Fox goes into the Magic Mirror and turns into a bear to condemn the tribe to her wrath, he watches as the Seven Little Men throw the Magic Mirror off the cliff trapping Sly Fox in the spirit world. Then he allows Flying Eagle to have White Snow's hand in marriage.

Happily N'Ever After
In Happily N'Ever After 2: Snow White Another Bite @ the Apple (a sequel to Happily N'Ever After), Snow White's father is depicted to be amalgamated with Old King Cole (voiced by Cam Clarke).

Once Upon a Time
In Once Upon a Time, the King is known and named as King Leopold (portrayed by Richard Schiff as an older man and by Eric Lange as a young prince). As a Prince, Leopold meets Cora after she is betrayed by Jonathan, a man claiming to be a Prince. The two form a strong bond until Cora learns he is engaged to Princess Eva, who informs Leopold of her secret child, leading him to remove Cora from his kingdom. Becoming King, Leopold marries Eva and the two have a daughter named Snow White. Though the Good Queen Eva later dies after being poisoned by Cora. After Cora's daughter Regina saves Snow White from a runaway horse, Leopold remarries once again her in order to give his daughter a stepmother.

He is always thankful for his daughter and rules his realm with kindness, wanting nothing except for the happiness of his kingdom and its subjects. When he finds the Genie's lamp, he cannot think of anything he desires. So instead, he frees the Genie and invites him to his castle to work with him. These actions end in disaster when the Genie falls in love with Regina and plots to kill the King to free her from the loveless marriage. The Genie places poisonous vipers from Agrabah in the King's bed, killing him.

Mirror Mirror
The King appears in Mirror Mirror portrayed by Sean Bean. When Snow White's mother died in childbirth, the King remarries once again with an evil and powerful sorceress named Clementianna who becomes in his new and second wife, the new and second queen and Snow White's stepmother. One day, the king leaves to fight a great evil that has invaded the land but never returns causing Queen Clementianna rules in his absence and keeps Snow White in the palace. Nobody knew it yet, but the King had been turned into the Beast (with its vocal effects provided by Frank Welker), a chimeric creature with a lion/dog-like head, the antlers of a deer, chicken leg-like arms, the wings of an eagle, and the body and tail of a snake with a tail-claw at the end of the tail. This Beast lives in the forests near Queen Clementianna's kingdom. In the climax of the film, Snow White encounters Queen Clementianna who reveals that she can control the Beast that has been plaguing the forest and sends it after Snow White. Prince Alcott tries to save Snow White, and after the struggle, the Beast captures the princess. However, the Beast hesitates in killing her and Snow White sees that it wears a necklace with a moon charm on it similar to the one the Queen wears. She cuts the chain with her father's dagger and the Beast suddenly becomes engulfed in light. The Beast turns out to be Snow White's father who has no memory of the last ten years. Grateful to Prince Alcott for his assistance, the King agrees to let him marry Snow White.

Snow White and the Huntsman
In Snow White and the Huntsman, the King is known and named as King Magnus and is portrayed by Noah Huntley. King Magnus ruled the Kingdom of Tabor with his wife, Queen Eleanor. When Eleanor, Snow White's mother, falls ill and dies, he and his army rescue someone named Ravenna from an invading dark army of demonic glass soldiers, and becoming enchanted with her beauty, marries her. Ravenna becomes his second wife, the new and second queen and Snow White's stepmother. What King Magnus didn't know was that Ravenna was an evil, powerful sorceress and queen, and her "rescue" was all a ruse concocted by her to take over his kingdom. On their wedding night, Ravenna stabs Magnus to death in his bed and invades the entire kingdom with a real army of soldiers.

Ever After High
In Ever After High, the King was referred to as the Good King. With the Evil Queen, he fathered Raven Queen.

Red Shoes and the Seven Dwarfs
In the Snow White parody Red Shoes and the Seven Dwarfs, the King was referred to as King White and is voiced by Nolan North.

References

Snow White characters
Fictional kings
Fictional characters without a name
Male characters in fairy tales